Wiveton is a village and civil parish in the English county of Norfolk.

For the purposes of local government, the parish falls within the district of North Norfolk.

History
The villages name origin is uncertain. 'Wife's farm/settlement' or 'women's farm/settlement'.

Until the 17th century, the River Glaven was navigable and Wiveton was a port. The outline of the former harbour can still be seen in the fields between Wiveton and Cley. Alongside this, marks from mooring ropes belonging to large transport barges can still be seen etched into the wall on the east side of the church.
Wiveton was in the national news in 1779 when James Hackman, its newly appointed rector, was hanged for the murder of Martha Ray, mistress of John Montagu, 4th Earl of Sandwich.

Wiveton church has a memorial to Royal Geographical Society Gold Medal Winner Lt. Colonel Frederick Marshman Bailey, one of the heroes of 'The Great Game'. Inside the church there is the joint memorial to Anne Fleming and Catherine Jennis.

A series of archaeological test pits were dug around the settlement between 2006 and 2008. The report was published in 2018.

References

External links

.
Wiveton Information from Genuki Norfolk
St Mary, Wiveton at norfolkchurches.co.uk
Wiveton at NorfolkCoast.co.uk

Villages in Norfolk
Civil parishes in Norfolk
North Norfolk